Aisling Reilly is an Irish Sinn Féin politician. In 2021 Aisling replaced Fra McCann as an MLA representing the Northern Irish Assembly constituency of West Belfast. Reilly was educated in Coláiste Feirste and speaks fluent Gaelic.

On 13 May 2022, Aisling became the first member of the Northern Ireland Assembly to give a full speech in the Irish language.

References

Living people
Sinn Féin MLAs
21st-century British politicians
Female members of the Northern Ireland Assembly
Northern Ireland MLAs 2017–2022
Politicians from Belfast
Year of birth missing (living people)
Northern Ireland MLAs 2022–2027